= Parco Adriano (Milan) =

Park in Milan, Italy

Coordinates: 45.5166°N 9.2376°E

Parco Adriano is a park in Milan, Italy. It contains many modern high-rise residential blocks, built between 2004 and 2007, covering an area of 120,000 m^{2}, overlooked by architect Franco Giorgetta.
